"Dancing Tonight" is a single by American singer Kat DeLuna, the fourth single from her second studio album Inside Out. The original title of the song was in fact "We'll Be Dancing", with the original top-line conceptualized and written by Sebastian La'Mar Jones. Jones then brought aboard Dallas Diamond, a then college student and friend enrolled at Full Sail University, to help finish the record. "Dancing Tonight" was produced by EightySix.

Track listings
Digital download
"Dancing Tonight" - 3:25
Promo CD
"Dancing Tonight" - 3:25
"Bailando" - 3:25
"Dancing Tonight" (86 & Soundset Remix)  - 4:15
"Bailando" (86 & Soundset Remix)  - 4:30

Dancing Tonight (iTunes Remixes)
"Dancing Tonight" (Radio Edit) - 3:23
"Dancing Tonight (feat. Fo Onassis)" (Main) - 3:22
"Bailando" (Radio Edit)  - 4:21
"Dancing Tonight" (Richard Bahericz & Claude Njoya Electro Club Remix)  - 5:21
"Dancing Tonight" (Latin Mix byEffect-O)  - 3:36
"Bailando" (Effect-O Latin Mix)  - 3:36
Dancing Tonight (Ralphi Rosario Remixes) - EP
"Dancing Tonight" (Ralphi Rosario Radio Edit)  - 3:36
"Dancing Tonight" (Ralphi Rosario Club Mix)  - 6:58
"Dancing Tonight" (Bugout & Carcione Remix)  - 7:40
"Bailando" (Ralphi Rosario Club Mix) - 6:34

Charts

End of year charts

See also
 List of number-one dance singles of 2011 (U.S.)

References

External links

2011 singles
Song recordings produced by RedOne
Kat DeLuna songs
2009 songs
Universal Motown Records singles
Songs written by Eightysix (Andras Vleminckx)